is a Japanese professional baseball Pitcher for the Fukuoka SoftBank Hawks of Nippon Professional Baseball.

Professional career
On October 26, 2020, Nakamura was drafted as a developmental player by the Fukuoka Softbank Hawks in the 2020 Nippon Professional Baseball draft.

In 2021 season, he played in the Western League of NPB's minor leagues and informal matches against Shikoku Island League Plus's teams and amateur baseball teams.

On July 2, 2022, Nakamura signed a 6.5 million yen contract as a registered player under control.  On July 7, he pitched his debut game against the Tohoku Rakuten Golden Eagles as a relief pitcher.

On November 10, 2022, the Hawks re-signed Nakamura as a developmental player at an estimated salary of 6.5 million yen, which is the same as his current salary. November 27, he will change his uniform number from 60 to 137 beginning with the 2023 season, it was announced.

References

External links

 Career statistics - NPB.jp
 60 Ryota Nakamura PLAYERS2022 - Fukuoka SoftBank Hawks Official site

1998 births
Living people
Fukuoka SoftBank Hawks players
Japanese baseball players
Nippon Professional Baseball pitchers
Baseball people from Chiba Prefecture